"Donna the Prima Donna" is a song written by Dion DiMucci and Ernie Maresca and performed by Dion. It reached No. 6 on the Billboard Hot 100, No. 9 on the Cash Box Top 100, and No. 17 on Billboards R&B chart in 1963, while reaching No. 17 on Canada's CHUM Hit Parade, and No. 2 in Hong Kong. It was from Dion's 1963 album, Donna the Prima Donna.

The track was produced by Robert Mersey and arranged by DiMucci.  The backing group is the Del-Satins.

It was ranked No. 86 on Billboard magazine's Top Hot 100 songs of 1963. It references Zsa Zsa Gabor and how the titular girl tries to look like her.

References

1963 songs
1963 singles
Songs written by Ernie Maresca
Dion DiMucci songs
Columbia Records singles
Songs written by Dion DiMucci